Peter Reed Saulson (born October 30, 1954) is an American physicist and professor at Syracuse University. He is best known as a former spokesperson for the LIGO collaboration serving from 2003 to 2007 and research on gravitational wave detectors.

Education
Saulson was born October 30, 1954 in Baltimore, Maryland into a Jewish family. studied physics at Harvard University where he earned a bachelor's degree  (magna cum laude) in 1976. He later studied at Princeton University where he received a master's degree in 1978 and a doctorate in 1981. He was then a post-doctoral student at the Massachusetts Institute of Technology, where he started in 1985 and worked as Principal Research Scientist until 1989. In 1989 he was a visiting scientist at the Joint Institute for Laboratory Astrophysics in Boulder, Colorado.

Career
Saulson is Martin A. Pomerantz '37 Professor of Physics at Syracuse University where he co-leads the Gravitational-Wave Astronomy Group. He was Associate Professor there from 1991 to 1999 and head of the physics department from 2010 to 2013. In 2000-01, he was a visiting professor at Louisiana State University and in 2000 Interferometer Commissioning Leader at LIGO and Caltech.

Saulson was the first elected speaker of the LIGO Scientific Collaboration, succeeding LIGO co-founder Rainer Weiss.

Awards
Saulson was named a fellow of the American Physical Society in 2003 for "his contributions to experimental gravitational physics including pioneering studies of thermal mechanisms affecting interferometer performance and for his educational contributions including authoring one of the most influential books in the field." He was named Syracuse University's 2003-04 University Scholar/Teacher of the Year.

In 2016 he received the National Academy of Sciences Award for Scientific Discovery with Gabriela González, his former PhD student, and David Reitze.

Works

References

External links

1954 births
Living people
American astrophysicists
Syracuse University faculty
Louisiana State University faculty
Harvard University alumni
Princeton University alumni
Massachusetts Institute of Technology alumni
Gravitational-wave astronomy
Fellows of the American Physical Society
20th-century American physicists
Members of the United States National Academy of Sciences
Scientists from Baltimore
American male non-fiction writers